Berezovka is a rural locality (a village) in Tabynsky Selsoviet, Gafuriysky District, Bashkortostan, Russia. The population was 154 as of 2010. There are 3 streets.

Geography 
Berezovka is located 26 km north of Krasnousolsky (the district's administrative centre) by road. Novye Burly is the nearest rural locality.

References 

Rural localities in Gafuriysky District